Albert Goudreau (February 4, 1887 – October 12, 1962) was a Canadian politician and a four-term Member of the Legislative Assembly of Quebec.

Background

He was born in Wotton, Eastern Townships on February 4, 1887.

City Councillor

Goudreau served as a city councillor in the township of Windsor from 1916 to 1918 and in the city of Asbestos from 1933 to 1944.

Member of the legislature

Goudreau ran as a Conservative candidate in the provincial district of Richmond in the 1935 election and won against Liberal incumbent Stanislas-Edmond Desmarais.

He joined Maurice Duplessis's Union Nationale and was re-elected in the 1936 election, but was defeated in the 1939 election.

He was re-elected in the 1944 and the 1948 elections, but was defeated by Liberal candidate Émilien Lafrance in the 1952 election.

Mayor

He served as Mayor of Asbestos from 1945 to 1950.

Death

He died on October 12, 1962, in Sherbrooke.

References

1887 births
1962 deaths
Mayors of places in Quebec
Conservative Party of Quebec MNAs
People from Estrie
Union Nationale (Quebec) MNAs